Hotel del Coronado, also known as The Del and Hotel Del, is a historic beachfront hotel in the city of Coronado, just across the San Diego Bay from San Diego, California. A rare surviving example of an American architectural genre—the wooden Victorian beach resort—it was designated a California Historical Landmark in 1970 and a National Historic Landmark in 1977. It is the second-largest wooden structure in the United States (after the Tillamook Air Museum in Tillamook, Oregon).

When the hotel opened in 1888, it was the largest resort hotel in the world. It has hosted presidents, royalty, and celebrities and been featured in numerous films and books.

The hotel has received a Four Diamond rating from the American Automobile Association and was listed in 2011 by USA Today among the top ten resorts in the world.

History

San Diego land boom 
In the mid-1880s, the San Diego region was amid one of its first real estate booms. At that time, it was common for a California developer to build a grand hotel as a draw to an otherwise barren landscape; examples include The Hollywood Hotel in Hollywood, the Raymond Hotel in Pasadena, the Hotel Del Monte in Monterey, and the Hotel Redondo in Redondo Beach.

Coronado Beach Company 
In November 1885, a group of five investors bought Coronado and North Island, about 4,000 acres, for $110,000. Those people were E. S. Babcock, retired railroad executive from Evansville, Indiana; Hampton L. Story, of the Story & Clark Piano Company of Chicago; Jacob Gruendike, president of the First National Bank of San Diego; Heber Ingle; and Joseph Collett.

In April 1886, Babcock and Story created the Coronado Beach Company, then additional enterprises to support the development of Coronado. The Coronado Ferry Company built wharves and storage facilities and developed ferryboat service between Coronado and San Diego; The Coronado Water Company piped fresh water under San Diego Bay from the San Diego River; The Coronado Railroad Company provided rail lines in Coronado, and eventually a "Belt Line" connected Coronado to San Diego via the Strand. Hotel del Coronado boasted one of the largest electrical power plants in the state, providing service to the entire community of Coronado until the 1920s.

The men hired architect James W. Reid, a native of New Brunswick, Canada, who first practiced in Evansville and Terre Haute. His younger brother Merritt Reid, a partner in Reid Brothers, the Evansville firm, stayed in Indiana, and brother Watson Reid helped supervise the 2,000 laborers needed.

Babcock's vision 
Babcock's visions for the hotel were grand:

It would be built around a court... a garden of tropical trees, shrubs and flowers,... From the south end, the foyer should open to Glorietta Bay with verandas for rest and promenade. On the ocean corner, there should be a pavilion tower, and northward along the ocean, a colonnade, terraced in grass to the beach. The dining wing should project at an angle from the southeast corner of the court and be almost detached, to give full value to the view of the ocean, bay and city."

Construction 
If the hotel were ever to be built, one of the numerous problems to overcome was the absence of lumber and labor in the San Diego area. The lumber problem was solved with contracts for exclusive rights to all raw lumber production of the Dolbeer & Carson Lumber Company of Eureka, California, which was one of the West's largest. Planing mills were built on site to finish raw lumber shipped directly from the Dolbeer & Carson lumber yards, located on the shores of Humboldt Bay. To obtain brick and concrete, Reid built his own kilns. He also constructed a metal shop and iron works.

Construction of the hotel began in March 1887, "on a sandspit populated by jack rabbits and coyotes". Labor was provided largely by Chinese immigrants from San Francisco and Oakland.

The Crown Room was Reid's masterpiece. Its wooden ceiling was installed with pegs and glue. Not a single nail was used.

Landscaping for the hotel was completed by Kate Sessions.

Planning for fire hazards 
Reid's plans were being revised and added to constantly. To deal with fire hazards, a freshwater pipeline was run under San Diego Bay. Water tanks and gravity flow sprinklers were installed. He also built two giant cisterns with concrete walls a foot thick in the basement to store rainwater. Although these cisterns were never used for rainwater, they were reputedly very handy for storing alcoholic beverages during Prohibition. Reid also installed the world's first oil furnace in the new hotel, prompting a Los Angeles oil company to build tankers to carry the oil to Coronado. Electric lighting in a hotel was also a world first. The electric wires were installed inside the gas lines, so if the electricity didn't work, they could use gas to illuminate the rooms. Contrary to popular rumor, Thomas Edison was not involved in the installation of The Del's electrical system. The electricity was installed by the Mather Electric Company out of Chicago (sometimes referred to as Mather-Perkins Company). An early Del brochure touted its "Mather incandescent electric lamps, of which there are 2,500." Electricity was still new to San Diego, having been introduced in 1886.

In 1904, Hotel del Coronado introduced the world's first electrically lighted, outdoor living Christmas tree. From the San Diego Union, December 25, 1904: "The tree selected for the honor is one of the three splendid Norfolk Island pines on the plaza [grassy area in front of the hotel]. It has attained a height of fifty feet and its branches stand proudly forth. All day yesterday electricians were busy fitting it up and by night 250 lights of many colors gave beauty to the fine old pine. Lanterns, great and small, hung from its boughs. And now that an open-air Christmas tree had been introduced, it is likely that another Christmas Eve will find many California gardens aglow with light scattered from living foliage."

Grand opening and real estate bust 
When the 399-room hotel opened for business in February 1888, 1,440 San Diegans traveled across the bay. Reports of the new grand hotel were wired across the country, but just as the hotel was nearing completion, the Southern California land boom collapsed.
Babcock and Story needed additional funds at a time when many people were deserting San Diego. Babcock turned to Captain Charles T. Hinde and sugar magnate John D. Spreckels, who lent them $100,000 to finish the hotel. The Coronado Beach Company was then capitalized with three million United States dollars. The company directors at this time were E.S. Babcock, John Diedrich Spreckels, Captain Charles T. Hinde, H.W. Mallett, and Giles Kellogg. By 1890 Spreckels bought out both Babcock and Story. The Spreckels family retained ownership of the hotel until 1948.

The original grounds had many amenities, including an Olympic-sized salt water pool, tennis courts, and a yacht club with architecture resembling the hotel's grand tower. A Japanese tea garden, an ostrich farm, billiards, bowling alleys, hunting expeditions, and deep sea fishing were some of the many features offered to its guests.

Prince Edward and Wallis Simpson 
On April 7, 1920, Edward, Prince of Wales was honored with a grand banquet in the Crown Room. Despite speculation that he met his future wife and Coronado resident Wallis Spencer there, most historians believe they met later; Edward and Wallis wrote in their memoirs that they met much later.

Hollywood's playground 
The popularity of the hotel was established before the 1920s. It already had hosted Presidents Harrison, McKinley, Taft, and Wilson. By the 1920s, Hollywood's stars and starlets discovered that 'the Del' was the 'in place' to stay and many celebrities made their way south to party during the 1920s and 1930s, specifically during the era of Prohibition. Douglas Fairbanks, Charlie Chaplin, Rudolph Valentino, Clark Gable, Errol Flynn, Mae West, Joan Crawford, Katharine Hepburn, Bette Davis and Ginger Rogers were a few of the many great players (actors) who stayed at the hotel.

On New Year's Day 1937, during the Great Depression, the gambling ship SS Monte Carlo, known for "drinks, dice, and dolls", was shipwrecked on the beach about a quarter mile south of the Hotel del Coronado.

World War II 
During World War II, many West Coast resorts and hotels were taken over by the U.S. government for use as housing and hospitals. The Hotel del Coronado housed many pilots who were being trained at nearby North Island Naval Air Station on a contract basis, but it was never commandeered. General manager Steven Royce convinced the Navy to abstain from taking over the hotel because most of the additional rooms were being used to house the families of officers. He pointed out that "the fathers, mothers, and wives were given priority to the rooms because it may be the last time they will see their sons and husbands." Ultimately the Navy agreed, and the hotel never was appropriated.

The hotel was designated as a "wartime casualty station". It began a victory garden program, planting vegetables on all spare grounds around the hotel.

Post-war 
Barney Goodman purchased the hotel from the Spreckels in 1948. From the end of World War II until 1960, the hotel began to age. While still outwardly beautiful, neglect was evident. In 1960, local millionaire John Alessio purchased the hotel and spent $2 million on refurbishment and redecorating. Popular Hollywood set designer Al Goodman was commissioned by Alessio to oversee the hotel's restoration and refurbishments, which notably included the Grand Ballroom, the Victorian Room Lounge, and the Victorian elevator grille.

Alessio sold the hotel to M. Larry Lawrence in 1963. Lawrence's initial plan was to develop the land around the hotel and ultimately, to demolish it, but he later changed his mind. During his tenure, Lawrence invested $150 million to refurbish and expand much of the hotel. He doubled its capacity to 700 rooms. He added the Grande Hall Convention Center and two seven-story Ocean Towers just south of the hotel.

The Lawrence family sold the hotel to the Travelers Group after Lawrence's death in 1996. The Travelers Group completed a $55 million upgrade of the hotel in 2001, which included seismic retrofitting.

21st century 
While retaining its classic Victorian look, the hotel continues to upgrade its facilities. In July 2005, the hotel obtained approval to construct up to 37 limited-term occupancy cottages and villas on the property. They also received approval to add up to 205 additional rooms.

The hotel has been sold in several transactions between financial institutions. In 2003, Travelers sold the property to CNL Hospitality Properties Inc. and KSL Recreation Corp (CNL/KSL). This ownership group completed a $10 million upgrade of 381 rooms in June, 2005. The hotel was then owned by the Blackstone Group LP (60%), Strategic Hotels & Resorts Inc. (34.5%), and KSL Resorts (5.5%). When Strategic Hotels & Resorts Inc. bought its stake in 2006, the hotel was valued at $745 million; as of 2011, the hotel was valued at roughly $590 million. In 2014, Strategic Hotels & Resorts became full owners of the hotel. In December 2015, Blackstone purchased Strategic Hotels & Resorts.

In March 2016, Blackstone sold Strategic Hotels & Resorts to Anbang Insurance Group, a Beijing-based Chinese insurance company, in a $6.5 billion deal involving multiple resorts. Anbang thus bought 16 luxury American hotel properties including the Hotel del Coronado. Fifteen of the 16 were immediately transferred to Anbang. However, the sale of the Hotel del Coronado was held up because of concerns expressed by the federal inter-agency Committee on Foreign Investment in the United States, which reviews acquisitions of U.S. businesses by foreign investors for possible national security risks. The agency was concerned about the hotel's proximity to major Navy bases. In October 2016 it was reported that the deal had fallen through and the hotel would remain in Blackstone's ownership.

In August 2017, Hilton Hotels and Resorts took over the management of Hotel del Coronado as part of their Curio Collection. The resort is still owned by Blackstone and the name Hotel del Coronado has not changed.

Hotel del Coronado was then inducted into Historic Hotels of America, the official program of the National Trust for Historic Preservation, in 2018.

The hotel began a redevelopment and expansion in February 2019 to add new entryway, more guest rooms, parking garages, another restaurant and more. The remodel is projected to last three years and cost $400 million.

On March 26, 2020, the hotel announced that it would be closing temporarily due to a reduction in business related to the worldwide COVID-19 epidemic. This was the first time in the property's 132-year history that it has closed its doors to guests. The hotel is now open again to the public.

Notable guests 
Notable guests have included 
Thomas Edison, Marilyn Monroe, L. Frank Baum, Charlie Chaplin, King Kalakaua of Hawaii, Vincent Price, Babe Ruth, James Stewart, Bette Davis and Katharine Hepburn. More recently, guests have included Kevin Costner, Whoopi Goldberg, Gene Hackman, George Harrison, Keanu Reeves, Brad Pitt, Madonna, Barbra Streisand, and Oprah Winfrey.

The following presidents have stayed at the hotel: Benjamin Harrison, William Howard Taft, Woodrow Wilson, Franklin D. Roosevelt, Lyndon B. Johnson, Richard Nixon, Gerald Ford, Jimmy Carter, Ronald Reagan, George H. W. Bush, Bill Clinton and George W. Bush.

Another famous resident of the hotel is the purported ghost of Kate Morgan. On November 24, 1892, she checked into room 302 (then 3312, now 3327). She told staff she was awaiting the arrival of her brother, who was a doctor. She said he was going to treat her stomach cancer, but he never arrived. She was found dead on the steps leading to the beach three days later. The case was declared a suicide; she had shot herself. Another tragedy took place on the beach at the hotel in 1904 when actress Isadore Rush drowned.

In popular culture 

Films
The hotel was first featured in a film when it was used as a backdrop for The Flying Fleet (1929). Since then, it has been featured in at least 12 other films, including: Some Like It Hot (1959), starring Marilyn Monroe, Jack Lemmon, and Tony Curtis, where it represented the "Seminole Ritz" in southern Florida; Wicked, Wicked (1973), which was completely filmed on location there; The Stunt Man (1980), starring Peter O'Toole; The Girl, the Gold Watch & Everything (1980) starring Pam Dawber; and My Blue Heaven (1990), starring Steve Martin and Rick Moranis.

The science historian James Burke filmed his special The Neuron Suite at the Coronado.

The Hotel del Coronado was the primary location for the filming of the fantasy-comedy feature film Daydream Hotel, which had its world premiere at the 1st Annual Coronado Island Film Festival in January 2016.

Literature
 In Moran of the "Lady Letty": A Story of Adventure Off the California Coast (1898) by Frank Norris, a shanghaied San Francisco dandy wins in a showdown against a Chinese triad gang on the shore of the Baja California Peninsula, teaching them the lesson: "Don't try to fight with white people." Triumphant from the final showdown the protagonist sails to San Diego and makes a dramatic appearance at a society soiree in the hotel's "incomparable round ballroom".
 L. Frank Baum, author of The Wonderful Wizard of Oz, did much of his writing at the hotel, and is said to have based his design for the Emerald City on it. However, other sources say the Emerald City was inspired by the "White City" of the Chicago World's Fair of 1893.
 Ambrose Bierce used the hotel as the setting for his short story, "An Heiress From Redhorse".
 It also was the setting for Richard Matheson's novel Bid Time Return (1975); however, for the movie version, Somewhere in Time (1980), the story setting and filming were moved to the Grand Hotel (Mackinac Island) on Mackinac Island, Michigan.
 The initial inspiration for Stephen King's short story "1408" came from a collection of real-life news stories about parapsychologist Christopher Chacon's investigation of a notoriously haunted room at the hotel.
 Lorin Morgan-Richards, children's author, has frequented the hotel and written and illustrated works while staying in the turret room. The cover of his book Dark Letter Days shows the image of the Del.

Music
 Hotel del Coronado is the setting of the Dashboard Confessional song "Stolen".

Stage productions
Each December since 1994, Lamb's Players Theatre and the hotel have presented An American Christmas, a 3-hour "Feast & Celebration" set 100 years earlier, in the hotel's ballroom.

Television
The hotel stood in for the fictional Mansfield House during host segments of the NBC anthology series Ghost Story in 1972. The storylines of Baywatch season 4, episodes 14 and 15, called "Coronado del Soul" Parts 1 and 2, evolve in and around the hotel.

The grounds and some interior areas were used in 3 episodes of Antiques Roadshow broadcast as S23 E7, S23 E8 and S23 E9 in February and April of 2019.

Postage stamp
The hotel is featured on a US Postage Stamp honoring director Billy Wilder, with images of Marilyn Monroe and the hotel from Some Like It Hot.

Gallery

See also 

 Thomas Gardiner, Coronado Beach Company advertising manager in the 1890s
 Charles T. Hinde, board member of the Hotel del Coronado, vice president of the Spreckels Brothers Commercial Company, railroad executive, and steamboat captain.
 Disney's Grand Floridian Resort & Spa, a 1988 hotel whose exterior architecture is based on the Hotel Del Coronado
 Grand Rapids Hotel, a 1922 hotel built by Frederick Hinde Zimmerman, the nephew of Captain Charles T. Hinde, one of the original investors of the Hotel del Coronado.

References 
Notes

Further reading
 
 Nolan, John Matthew "2,543 Days: A History of the Hotel at the Grand Rapids Dam on the Wabash River" Discusses Charles T. Hinde, one of the silent investors of the Hotel del Coronado and how the Hotel del Coronado influenced the Grand Rapids Hotel in Wabash County, Illinois.

External links 

 
 Journal of San Diego History  historic photographs of the hotel
 New York Times review of the Hotel del Coronado

Hotels in San Diego
Coronado, California
Buildings and structures in San Diego County, California
Companies based in San Diego County, California
History of San Diego County, California
Hotel buildings completed in 1888
Hotels established in 1888
Hotel buildings on the National Register of Historic Places in California
National Register of Historic Places in San Diego County, California
National Historic Landmarks in California
1888 establishments in California
Reportedly haunted locations in California
Tourist attractions in San Diego County, California
Reid & Reid buildings
Queen Anne architecture in California
Victorian architecture in California
Historic Hotels of America